The third season of Portuguese The Voice Kids is a talent show broadcast on RTP1, which premiered on 8 May 2022. Carlão, Carolina Deslandes and Fernando Daniel returned for their second seasons as coaches and in the meantime, Marisa Liz was replaced by young sensation Bárbara Tinoco. Presenter Catarina Furtado continues to host the show, and Fábio Lopes also returns as the backstage presenter.

Maria Gil won the season, marking Fernando Daniel's second consecutive win as a coach. Just like in 2021, The Voice Kids was the program used to select the Portuguese artist that would represent the country in the Junior Eurovision Song Contest 2022. However, this time the winner (Gil) could not represent Portugal due to being above the age eligible for participants in the contest. On 10 August, RTP confirmed that one of the runners-up, Nicolas Alves, was selected to represent Portugal in the Junior Eurovision Song Contest 2022, as he received the second biggest amount of votes to win The Voice Kids season three. Contrary to the final episode, as only the winner placement was announced, this implies that Margarida Rodrigues and Martim Helena finished in third place.

Teams 
 Colour key

  Winner
  Runner-up
  Third place
  Eliminated in the Live final
  Eliminated in the Live semifinals
  Saved by another coach in the Battles
  Eliminated in Battles

Blind auditions 
Same as the previous season, in the Provas Cegas (Blind auditions), each coach was given two blocks to use and prevent another coach from pitching for the artist. The block buttons could be used at any time until the artist has finished their audition.

Episode 1 (8 May 2022)

Episode 2 (15 May)

Episode 3 (22 May)

Episode 4 (29 May)

Episode 5 (5 June)

Episode 6 (19 June)

Postponed auditions 

During the blind auditions recording day, four participants tested positive for COVID-19 and were unable to perform. Their auditions were postponed and, after a draw, Carlão was the coach chosen to listen to these participants and choose only one of them to be on his team.

Battles 
For the Batalhas (Battles), each coach invited an advisor to help in the rehearsals with their teams: Agir for Team Fernando, Os Quatro e Meia for Team Bárbara, Dino D'Santiago for Team Carlão, and Miguel Cristovinho for Team Carolina.

After each battle, each coach can steal one losing artist from another team battle.

Episode 7 (26 June)

Episode 8 (3 July)

Episode 9 (10 July)

Live shows

Episode 10: Semifinal 1 (17 July)

Episode 11: Semifinal 2 (24 July)

Episode 12: Final (31 July)

Elimination chart 
Teams colour key

  Team Fernando
  Team Bárbara
  Team Carlão
  Team Carolina

Results colour key

  Winner
  Runner-up
  Third place
  Saved by public vote
  Eliminated

References

External links

The Voice Portugal
2022 Portuguese television seasons